Prvoslav Ilić (born January 25, 1952) is a Serbian former wrestler who competed in the 1980 Summer Olympics where he won 5th place.

References

External links
 

1952 births
Living people
Serbian male sport wrestlers
Olympic wrestlers of Yugoslavia
Wrestlers at the 1980 Summer Olympics
Yugoslav male sport wrestlers
European Wrestling Championships medalists